Cooksey is an English surname. It is commonly found in the West Midlands, originally given to people from Cooksey in Worcestershire. Notable people with the surname include:

 Catherine Cooksey, American chemist
Cleophus Cooksey Jr. (born 1982), American serial killer
Danny Cooksey (born 1975), American actor
 David Cooksey (born 1940), British businessman
 Donald Cooksey (1892–1977), American physicist
 Ernie Cooksey (1980–2008), English footballer
 Frank C. Cooksey (born 1933), American politician and environmental activist
 John Cooksey (born 1941), American physician and politician
 Mark Cooksey  (born 1966), English video game musician.
 Patricia Cooksey (born 1958), American jockey
 Poppy Cooksey (born 1940), as Janet Wardell-Yerburgh a British Olympic fencer
 Scott Cooksey (born 1972), English footballer

References

English-language surnames
English toponymic surnames